Arthur or Arthur Junction due to its location  at the junction of Indiana 61 and Indiana 64, is an unincorporated community in Patoka Township, Pike County, in the U.S. state of Indiana.

History
A post office was established at Arthur in 1873, and remained in operation until 1903. The community was named for Arthur Thompson, an early settler.

Geography

References

Unincorporated communities in Pike County, Indiana
Unincorporated communities in Indiana